Cynthia L. Bauerly (born 1970) is an American civil servant who currently serves as the Commissioner of the Minnesota Department of Revenue.  She was appointed commissioner in January 2015 after joining the department as deputy commissioner in the spring of 2014.

Сareer 
Prior to joining Revenue, she served as Deputy Commissioner of Workforce Development at the Minnesota Department of Employment and Economic Development (DEED).

Prior to her state government service, she served in various federal roles, including being a member of the United States Federal Election Commission. She was nominated by President George W. Bush on May 6, 2008. Her appointment received the unanimous consent of the United States Senate on June 24, 2008.

Prior to her appointment, Ms. Bauerly served as Legislative Director for Senator Charles E. Schumer of New York.

In 2004 and 2005, Ms. Bauerly specialized in intellectual property and business litigation with Fredrikson & Byron in Minneapolis, Minnesota. From February until November 2005, she was the policy director for Amy Klobuchar’s successful United States Senate campaign in Minnesota.

From 2002 until 2004, Ms. Bauerly served as Senator Schumer's counsel on the Senate Judiciary Committee and Senate Rules Committee.

Prior to her work for Senator Schumer, she specialized in complex litigation and appellate law at Jones Day in Washington, D.C. She previously served as a judicial clerk for Florence-Marie Cooper of the United States District Court for the Central District of California and Theodore R. Boehm of the Indiana Supreme Court.

Education 
Ms. Bauerly graduated cum laude from Indiana University School of Law – Bloomington and received a Master of Public Affairs from Indiana University's School of Environmental and Public Affairs. Ms. Bauerly is a summa cum laude graduate of Concordia College in Moorhead, Minnesota.

References

https://www.revenue.state.mn.us/leadership-team

American women lawyers
American lawyers
Indiana University Maurer School of Law alumni
Living people
Members of the Federal Election Commission
George W. Bush administration personnel
Obama administration personnel
21st-century American women
1970 births